KPOC-FM (104.1 FM, "Lite 104.1") is a radio station broadcasting an Adult Contemporary music format. Licensed to Pocahontas, Arkansas, United States.  The station is currently owned by Combined Media Group.

References

External links

POC-FM